Hotel Dnipro is a four-star hotel located in central Kyiv, the capital of Ukraine, on European Square, next to Khreschatyk Street and near Maidan Nezalezhnosti (Independence Square).

The hotel was built in 1964 in a location which originally was occupied by Kyiv's Hotel Yevropa. The interior and design of the restaurant in the Hotel Dnipro was made by the architect Irma Karakis.

Formally state owned, in July 2020 the hotel was sold to the private real estate company Smartland. Smartland won an open auction with their bid of ₴1,111,111,222.22 (about US$40 million (at the time)).

Location
The four-star Dnipro Hotel is located in the center of Kyiv on European Square. It is situated next to Khreschatyk Street and near Maidan Nezalezhnosti (Independence Square).

The area where the modern building sits is significant to the history of Kyiv and its geography. Being located close to the Dnieper and facing it directly, the view out of the hotel rooms is appreciable, overlooking the river and the Kyiv Hills covered in parks, churches and museums.

See also 

 List of hotels in Ukraine#Kyiv

References

Citations

Bibliography

External links
 Hotel Dnipro at the State Management of Affairs archived website (in July 2020 the hotel was sold to a private real estate company)

Buildings and structures in Kyiv
History of Kyiv
Hotels in Kyiv
Hotels built in the Soviet Union
Buildings and structures completed in 1964
Hotels established in 1964
Hotel buildings completed in 1964
1964 establishments in Ukraine